General Sir Henry Pigot GCMG (1750 – 7 June 1840) was a British Army officer.

Military career
Born the son of Admiral Hugh Pigot, Pigot was commissioned as a cornet in 1769. He served in the Netherlands in 1793 and, following the Siege of Malta, accepted the surrender of Valletta from the French forces under General Claude-Henri Belgrand de Vaubois in September 1800. He went on to be Civil Commissioner of Malta in February 1801. As civil commissioner, he accepted the demolition of the majority of the fortifications of Valletta, but this act was never done and the city walls survive largely intact to this day.

Pigot was colonel of the 82nd Regiment of Foot (1798–1836) and then of the 38th Regiment of Foot (1836–1840). He was promoted full general on 1 January 1812 and appointed a Knight Grand Cross of the Order of St Michael and St George in 1837.

References

|-

|-

1750 births
1840 deaths
British Army generals
Knights Grand Cross of the Order of St Michael and St George
Governors and Governors-General of Malta
British Army personnel of the French Revolutionary Wars